Aglaia crassinervia is a species of plant in the family Meliaceae. It is found in Brunei, India, Indonesia, Malaysia, Myanmar, the Philippines, and Thailand.

References

crassinervia
Near threatened plants
Taxonomy articles created by Polbot